Līga Kļaviņa (born January 27, 1980 in Tukums) is a female heptathlete from Latvia, who began her career as a high jumper. She competed for her native Baltic country at the 2000 Summer Olympics in Sydney, Australia.

Achievements

References

sports-reference

1980 births
Living people
Latvian female high jumpers
Latvian heptathletes
Athletes (track and field) at the 2000 Summer Olympics
Olympic athletes of Latvia